Dzharaonyx (meaning "Dzharakuduk claw", named after the type locality) is a genus of alvarezsaurid theropod dinosaur from the Late Cretaceous Bissekty Formation of Uzbekistan. The type species is Dzharaonyx eski; eski being an Uzbek word for "old".

Description 
Dzharaonyx is known from a series of disassociated but well-preserved postcranial material. The form of the humerus is intermediate between that of Patagonykus and Mononykus.

Classification 
Phylogenetic analysis places Dzharaonyx in a polytomy including other Asian members of Parvicursorinae. This makes it the oldest parvicursorine known to date.

{{clade|{{clade
 |1=Alvarezsaurus
 |2={{clade
    |1=Achillesaurus
    |2={{clade
      |1=Albertonykus
      |2={{clade
        |1=
        |label2=Parvicursorinae
        |2={{clade
          |1=Albinykus
          |2=Xixianykus
          |3=PIN 5838/1 (=Ondogurvel)
          |4=Khulsanurus
          |5=Dzharaonyx
          |6=
          |7= }} }} }} }} }}|style=font-size:85%; line-height:85%;|label1=Alvarezsauridae}}

 Paleoenvironment Dzharaonyx lived in the Bissekty Formation, which has been intensively studied in recent years.  It represents a brackish environment. It coexisted with larger theropods including the dromaeosaurid Itemirus, the tyrannosauroid Timurlengia, and the troodontid Urbacodon. The hadrosaur Levnesovia, ankylosaurs, and the sauropod Dzharatitanis'' represented the herbivores in this ecosystem.

References 

Bissekty Formation
Alvarezsaurids
Fossil taxa described in 2022